The AgustaWestland AW149 is a medium-lift multi-role military helicopter developed by AgustaWestland, now Leonardo, launched in 2006. On 20 June 2011 AgustaWestland announced the AW189, a civilian development of the AW149, for service in 2013.

Design and development
The AW149 was unveiled at the 2006 Farnborough Air Show. Derived from the AW139, the AW149 has a larger fuselage and more powerful engines, resulting in a greater cargo volume and payload carrying ability. On 13 November 2009, the first prototype conducted its first flight from AgustaWestland's Vergiate manufacturing facility in northern Italy. On 26 February 2011, the second prototype, the first with production model engines, made its first flight from Vergiate.

Operational history
Military certification for the AW149 was announced by Finmeccanica at the 2014 Farnborough airshow. The landing gear can sustain a touchdown with a sink speed of 9.5 m/s, compared with the 2 m/s for a civilian helicopter.  The AW149 is being marketed as an alternative to the Sikorsky UH-60 Black Hawk family. Thailand has ordered 5 AW149 helicopters, and is the first export customer. The Italian Air Force considered it as a search and rescue helicopter, but chose the lighter AW139M instead.

In April 2019, the Egyptian Navy ordered 24 AW149s with option for 10 more; first deliveries took place in late 2020.

AgustaWestland submitted a version of the AW149, designated TUHP149, as a candidate for the Turkish Utility Helicopter Program (TUHP) for the Turkish Armed Forces. The programme sought an initial batch of 109 helicopters worth $4 billion, prospective follow-on orders for subsequent batches may eventually rise to 300 rotorcraft. On 21 April 2011, the Turkish defence minister announced that the Sikorsky S-70i Black Hawk had been selected as the winner.

Leonardo has proposed the AW149 for the UK's New Medium Helicopter programme, which aims to replace the RAF's Puma helicopters, with production to be at Leonardo's Yeovil factory if the bid is successful.

In June 2022 Polish defence minister said Poland would order 32 AW149 helicopters, with production to be at Leonardo's PZL Świdnik factory. The contract was signed on July 1, 2022, and has a value of $1.85 billion (€1.76 billion). Delivery planned in years 2023-2029.

Operators

 Egyptian Navy (24 ordered in 2019 with options for 10 more; 5 delivered in 2020, 5 delivered in 2021)

 Polish Army (32 ordered in 2022, delivery planned from 2023 to 2029)

 Royal Thai Police (1 in service)
 Royal Thai Army (5 in service)

Specifications (AW149)

See also

References

External links

 Leonardo AW149 page
 Turkish Utility Helicopter Programme TUHP 149 - More Details Released
 AgustaWestland Unveils AW149 for Turkey

Military helicopters
AW149
2000s international military transport aircraft
2000s international helicopters
Twin-turbine helicopters
Aircraft first flown in 2009